OMNY (short for One Metro New York) is a contactless fare payment system, currently being implemented for use on public transit in the New York metropolitan area. OMNY can currently be used to pay fares at all New York City Subway and Staten Island Railway stations and on all MTA buses; when completely rolled out, it will replace the MetroCard on PATH trains, Bee-Line buses, NICE buses, and AirTrain JFK. OMNY will also expand beyond the current scope of the MetroCard to include the Long Island Rail Road and Metro-North Railroad. 

The MetroCard, a magnetic stripe card, was first introduced in 1993 and was used to pay fares on MTA subways and buses, as well as on other networks such as the PATH train. Two limited contactless-payment trials were conducted around the New York City area in 2006 and in 2010. However, formal planning for a full replacement of the MetroCard did not start until 2016.

The OMNY system is designed by Cubic Transportation Systems, using technology licensed from Transport for London's Oyster card. OMNY began its public rollout in May 2019, with contactless bank cards and mobile payments accepted at select subway stations and on buses in Staten Island. The Staten Island Railway received OMNY readers in December 2019, and rollout on the New York City Subway and on MTA buses was completed on December 31, 2020. The MTA began offering OMNY contactless cards on October 1, 2021, and introduced fare capping on February 28, 2022. Reduced-fare customers were allowed to use OMNY starting in June 2022. Full deployment to other New York City-area transit systems is expected by 2023, after which MetroCard will be completely phased out.

Predecessors

Previous fare media 

Subway tokens had been used as the MTA subway and bus systems' form of fare payment since the 1950s. MetroCards made by Cubic Transportation Systems started to replace the tokens in 1992; the MetroCards used magnetic stripes to encode the fare payment. By 2003, the MetroCard was the exclusive method of fare payment systemwide.

Payment system trials 
MasterCard and Citibank funded a trial of contactless payments, branded as PayPass. The trial was conducted at 25 subway stations, mostly on the IRT Lexington Avenue Line, beginning in July 2006. The trial was limited to select Citibank cardholders, but it proved popular enough to be extended past its original end date of December 2006.

In light of the success of the first contactless payment trial in 2006, another trial was conducted from June to November 2010. The 2010 trial initially only supported MasterCard-branded cards, expanding to Visa PayWave cards in August. The 2010 trial eventually expanded to include multiple Manhattan bus routes, two New Jersey Transit bus routes, and most PATH stations.

Proposal

In 2016, the MTA announced that it would begin designing a new contactless fare payment system to replace the MetroCard. The replacement system was initially planned for partial implementation in 2018 and full implementation by 2022. In October 2017, the MTA started installing eTix-compatible electronic ticketing turnstiles in 14 stations in Manhattan. The eTix system, already used on the Long Island Rail Road and Metro-North Railroad, allows passengers to pay their fares using their phones. The system would originally be for MTA employees only.

On October 23, 2017, it was announced that the MetroCard would be phased out and replaced by a contactless fare payment system also by Cubic, with fare payment being made using Android Pay, Apple Pay, Samsung Pay, debit/credit cards with near-field communication enabled, or radio-frequency identification cards. The announcement called for a phased rollout, culminating in the discontinuation of the MetroCard by 2023. The replacement fare system was criticized because the new turnstiles could be hacked, thereby leaving credit card and phone information vulnerable to theft. The payment system would use technology licensed from Transport for London's Oyster card.

Rollout

In June 2018, the MTA revised the timeline for implementation of the then-unnamed new payment system. The first stage of implementation would take place in May 2019. In the second stage, all subway stations would receive OMNY readers by October 2020, in preparation for the third stage, which involved the launch of a prepaid OMNY card by February 2021. The fourth stage involved the installation of OMNY vending machines by March 2022, and the MetroCard would be discontinued in 2023. 

Initially, there were disagreements about what the payment system should be called; some executives wanted a "traditional" name that resembled the MetroCard's name, while others wanted more unusual names. Possible names included "MetroTap", "Tony", "Liberty" and "Pretzel". The name "OMNY" was eventually chosen as being "modern and universal". The OMNY name was announced in February 2019. "OMNY" is an acronym of "One Metro New York," intended to signify its eventual broad acceptance across the New York metropolitan area.

An internal trial launched in March 2019, involving over 1,100 MTA employees and 300 other participants. Over 1,200 readers were installed in subway stations and buses for the public trial, and the OMNY.info website was created. Weeks before the beginning of the public launch, $85.4 million had been spent on the project, out of a total budget of $644.7 million. The budget had risen to $677 million by June 2020 and to $732 million by November 2020. The budget was $772 million by June 2021.

Buses and rapid transit 
At a presentation in May 2019, the MTA's Capital Program Oversight Committee specified the following items to be implemented at an unspecified future date: launch a mobile app, allow customers to pay with OMNY Cards on Access-a-Ride paratransit vehicles, and add OMNY readers on Select Bus Service buses to support all-door boarding. However, the committee expressed concerns that some bank cards would not be accepted, and that OMNY transactions could take longer than MetroCard transactions, increasing crowding at turnstiles. All-door boarding at Select Bus Service routes with OMNY began on July 20, 2020.

OMNY launched to the public on May 31, 2019, on Staten Island buses and at 16 subway stations. At first, OMNY only supported single-ride fares paid with contactless bank cards; mobile payments such as Apple Pay and Google Pay were also accepted, and free transfers between OMNY-enabled routes were available with the same transfer restrictions placed upon the MetroCard. In June and July 2019, Mastercard offered "Fareback Fridays" to promote the system, where it would refund up to two rides made using OMNY on Fridays. The OMNY system reached one million uses within its first 10 weeks and two million uses within 16 weeks. On one day in June, 18,000 taps were recorded from bank cards issued in 82 countries. 

In November 2019, the MTA announced its first expansion. Over the following month, 48 additional stations would be outfitted with OMNY readers the following month, thereby bringing the system to all five boroughs, and by January 2020 the system would then be expanded to Manhattan bus routes. Furthermore, the MTA would begin launching pilot programs on Select Bus Service, the city's bus rapid transit system, and add self-service features. By then, over three million riders with bank cards from 111 countries had used OMNY. According to an internal MTA report, these riders had used over 460,000 unique payment methods between them, or about 2,000 new payment methods per day. With the implementation of OMNY on the Staten Island Railway in December 2019, public transit in Staten Island became fully OMNY-compatible. The next month, MTA officials announced that OMNY had seen its 5-millionth use, and also that it would expand to 60 more subway stations by the end of the month. In addition, the MTA launched a marketing campaign for OMNY. After another expansion the next month, there were over 180 OMNY-equipped stations and OMNY had been used over 7 million times. This grew to 10 million uses by the time yet another expansion was announced in March. 

No new OMNY installations were added from March to June 2020 due to the COVID-19 pandemic in New York City. The pandemic delayed the target date for which OMNY would be implemented at all subway stations and MTA bus routes, which was pushed back from October to December 2020. OMNY installation in Manhattan was completed in July 2020. By that September, two-thirds of subway stations were OMNY-equipped; this included all stations in the Bronx, Manhattan, and Staten Island, as well as buses in the latter two boroughs. In November 2020, OMNY readers were installed at AutoGates, where disabled riders could enter and exit the system. , OMNY had been rolled out to 458 subway stations, representing 97% of the total, and OMNY had been used 30 million times. On December 31, 2020, the MTA announced that OMNY was active on all MTA buses and at all subway stations, after the last OMNY readers were activated at Eastern Parkway–Brooklyn Museum station. 

By July 2021, one-sixth of all fares paid on the bus, subway, and Staten Island Railway were being paid through OMNY, and 100 million fares had been paid using the fare system. In October 2021, the MTA started selling a standard-design OMNY card at certain retail locations throughout New York City, such as CVS, 7/11 and Duane Reade drugstores, as well as bodegas, CFSC Check Cashing, and dollar stores that sold MetroCards. The MTA planned to expand the rollout to vending machines inside stations in September 2022. OMNY cards featuring commemorative designs, as well as special fare-classes such as students, senior citizens, and MTA employees, were not available at the time of the standalone OMNY Card rollout. In addition, even at the end of 2021, reduced pay-per-ride OMNY fares were not available at all. The physical card was seldom used in the months after its rollout; by February 2022, less than 1 percent of all OMNY fares were being paid using a card, and 4,367 cards had been sold at stores.

Reduced pay-per-ride OMNY fares were supposed to become available in mid-2022. Reduced-fare OMNY was finally activated in October 2022, although it was not available to Fair Fares riders and students.

PATH and commuter rail 
, the MTA also plans to use OMNY on the Long Island Rail Road and Metro-North Railroad over "the next several years". In June 2019, the Port Authority of New York and New Jersey announced it was in talks with the MTA to implement OMNY on the PATH by 2022. There are no plans for OMNY to be used on NJ Transit, which plans to implement a new fare payment system with a different contractor by late 2024.

Plans for OMNY installation on the LIRR and Metro-North were still being revised . The COVID-19 pandemic had pushed back the implementation of fare cards on the commuter railroads from February 2021 to June 2022, and that of in-system vending machines from March 2022 to June 2023. , there were delays in the commuter railroads' mobile ticketing system as well as vending machines. According to the MTA's independent engineering consultant, this could potentially delay full rollout of OMNY for six months from the original projected completion date of July 2023. By February 2022, the rollout of OMNY on the LIRR was pushed back to between 2023 and 2024.

Other agencies
As part of the rollout, OMNY is expected to replace MetroCard on affiliate agencies such as Westchester County's Bee-Line Bus System, the Nassau Inter-County Express, and Roosevelt Island Tramway. , Westchester County's Bee Line expects OMNY to begin rolling out in 2025 at the earliest, along with Nassau County's NICE Bus System and the Roosevelt Island Tramway.

Timeline

This list shows when direct entry by OMNY reader became possible on each bus line and subway segment. A green row indicates when a subway line fully implemented OMNY.

Physical attributes 
The standard OMNY card is valid for seven years from purchase. It contains two barcodes on the front and back; one barcode is used to record the card being purchased, and the other is used to encode fare information. On the standard card, half of the front side contains a barcode, which is oriented to resemble railroad tracks, while the other half of the front side contains a white-on-black OMNY logo. The back of the card contains the card number, card security code, expiration date, and the other barcode.

Fares

OMNY-specific features 

The technology for making a transfer on MTA buses and subways differs slightly between MetroCards and OMNY devices. To allow for operation on vehicles disconnected from the MTA communications network, MetroCards store information about the transfer on the card itself. Third-party digital wallets, debit cards, credit cards generally cannot store transit-specific information on the consumer card or device. OMNY solves this problem by only charging riders once a day, after vehicles have had a chance to return to base and download boarding data. Though the second entry may display to the rider that the full fare is being charged, as long as the same device was used within the two-hour window, it is discounted when calculating the amount to actually be paid.

The OMNY system is also able to measure the usage of OMNY cards. In October 2021, the MTA considered enabling a fare cap on OMNY cards and devices, similar to the fare caps on Oyster cards. Under the proposal, an OMNY card or device would be charged a pay-per-ride fare on MTA buses and subways if a passenger has made fewer than a specified number of trips in a certain time period. After the passenger makes more than that quantity of trips, they would be charged the unlimited rate. For example, with a pay-per-ride fare of $2.75 and a weekly unlimited MetroCard cost of $33 (as of October 2021), a passenger would still pay $2.75 per trip if they made 12 or fewer trips in a week; under the proposal, they would pay no more than $33 within a week, even if they made 13 or more trips. OMNY fare caps were implemented on February 28, 2022.

Since June 1, 2022, riders who qualified for reduced-fare MetroCards could also use OMNY with their contactless bank cards or smart devices, paying half the standard fare. At the time, reduced-fare OMNYcards were unavailable. Each qualifying rider can only use one contactless card or device for reduced-fare OMNY. If a reduced-fare rider has more than one card or device, the other cards and devices will either be charged a full fare or be restricted from tapping-in at an OMNY reader.

Concerns 
The oversight group Surveillance Technology Oversight Project (STOP) has stated concerns about the lack of privacy regulation in the OMNY system, specifically that trip data may be used by the New York City Police Department for police surveillance or might be shared with U.S. Immigration and Customs Enforcement to track undocumented immigrants.

In February 2020, the MTA warned that some customers using Apple Pay's Express Transit feature might be accidentally double-charged if they were using a MetroCard. This occurred when riders unintentionally had their phones in proximity to the OMNY readers. At that point, the issue was relatively rare, having been reported 30 times.

See also 

 New York City transit fares

Notes

References

External links

Fare collection systems in the United States
Bus transportation in New York City
Products introduced in 2019
Metropolitan Transportation Authority
New York City Subway fare payment
MTA Regional Bus Operations
2019 establishments in New York City